The men's 10000 metres at the 2014 European Athletics Championships was held at the Letzigrund on 13 August.

Medalists

Records

Schedule

Results

References

 Final Results

10000 M
10,000 metres at the European Athletics Championships
Marathons in Switzerland